Bremen is a city in Haralson and Carroll counties, Georgia, United States. As of the 2010 census, the city had a population of 6,227, up from 4,579 at the 2000 census. Most of the city is in Haralson County, with a small portion in Carroll County.

Geography
Bremen is located in southern Haralson County and northern Carroll County at  (33.715933, -85.147213). U.S. Route 78 passes through the center of the city, leading east  to Temple and west  to Tallapoosa. U.S. Route 27 passes through the western part of the city, leading north  to Rome and south  to LaGrange. Interstate 20 passes through the southern part of the city, leading east  to Atlanta and west  to Birmingham, Alabama.

Climate

This region experiences hot and wet summers with rainy days. According to the Köppen Climate Classification system, Bremen has a humid subtropical climate (Köppen Cfa).

There are cool winters during which intense rainfall occurs. 

Snow in Bremen is possible in winter months due to the higher latitude.

Demographics

2020 census

As of the 2020 United States census, there were 7,185 people, 2,180 households, and 1,605 families residing in the city.

2000 census
At the 2000 census, there were 4,579 people, 1,824 households and 1,245 families residing in the city. The racial makeup of the city was 88.53% White, 9.54% African American, 0.22% Native American, 0.74% Asian, 0.24% from other races, and 0.72% from two or more races. Hispanic or Latino people of any race were 0.87% of the population.

There were 1,824 households, of which 32.6% had children under the age of 18 living with them, 51.0% were married couples living together, 13.7% had a female householder with no husband present, and 31.7% were non-families. 28.6% of all households were made up of individuals, and 13.8% had someone living alone who was 65 years of age or older. The average household size was 2.43 and the average family size was 2.98.

Age distribution was 25.5% under the age of 18, 8.0% from 18 to 24, 28.5% from 25 to 44, 20.0% from 45 to 64, and 18.1% who were 65 years of age or older. The median age was 37 years. For every 100 females, there were 85.5 males. For every 100 females age 18 and over, there were 81.4 males.

The median household income $29,354, and the median family income was $39,674. Males had a median income of $32,500 versus $20,823 for females. The per capita income for the city was $16,833. About 6.2% of families and 10.3% of the population were below the poverty line, including 7.8% of those under age 18 and 12.8% of those age 65 or over.

Culture

Bremen is the home of Hugh McGraw, a noted scholar of American hymnody and the foremost expert in and promoter of the Sacred Harp tradition of shape note singing. The Sacred Harp Publishing Company, which McGraw led from 1958–2002, is located in nearby Carrollton. Holly Springs Primitive Baptist Church, which holds an annual two-day Sacred Harp singing convention in June and an-all day singing in November, is located in Bremen. The Church at Chapelhill meets at Mill Town Music Hall on Sunday at 11am.

Early inhabitants
Prior to the early 18th century, Bremen and most of Georgia were home to American Indians belonging to a southeastern alliance known as the Creek Confederacy. The present day Creek Nation, also known as the Muskogee, were the major tribe in that alliance. According to Creek traditions, the Creek Confederacy migrated to the southeastern United States from the Southwest. The confederacy was probably formed as a defense against other large groups to the north. The name "Creek" came from the shortening of "Ocheese Creek" Indians, a name given by the English to the native people living along the Ocheese Creek (or Ocmulgee River). In time, the name was applied to all groups of the Creek Confederacy.

History

The town of Kramer was incorporated on September 5, 1883, and given the name Bremen. It was originally named for a German immigrant who owned a local vineyard but the name was changed at Kramer's request to honor the city of Bremen, Germany.

Bremen's economy was given a significant boost when the Chattanooga, Rome and Columbus Railroad was built, intersecting the Georgia Pacific at Bremen. This and other circumstances have helped Bremen to grow from a simple railroad junction settled by German immigrants to the largest town in Haralson County.

Services provided by the city of Bremen

Law enforcement
Fire protection and fire safety
Road and street construction/maintenance
Solid waste management
Water supply/distribution
Wastewater treatment
Enforcement of building, housing, plumbing, and electrical codes and other similar codes
Planning and zoning
Independent city school system
Public library
Recreational facilities
Senior citizen center
Education

Bremen City School District 
The Bremen City School District provides education for pre-school to grade twelve, consisting of three elementary schools, a middle school and a high school. The district has 96 full-time teachers and over 1,575 students.
Bremen 4th/5th Academy
Crossroad Academy
Jones Elementary
Bremen Middle School
Bremen High School

Public library
Warren P. Sewell Library, 315 Hamilton Avenue

Higgins General Hospital

Higgins General Hospital became affiliated with Tanner Health System in 1998. The 25-bed critical access hospital recently underwent an extensive $7.5 million renovation and expansion and offers its community inpatient as well as outpatient medical services including a 24-hour Emergency Department, same-day surgery, lithotripsy, and a wide range of outpatient services.

It was originally named Bremen General Hospital when it opened on January 3, 1955. The name was changed to Higgins General Hospital on May 1, 1973 in recognition of the work and dedication of its chairman, S.O. (Samuel) Higgins, Sr.

Cost of living index
The December 2009 cost of living index in Bremen was 81.9 (low, compared with the U.S. average of 100).

Media and communications
 WGMI (1440 AM; 3 kW; Bremen; owner: Garner Ministries, Inc.)
 Bremen Gateway Beacon, "The voice of Haralson County" - the legal organ newspaper for Haralson County

Bremen Towne Festival
The Bremen Towne Festival is an annual event held on the third Saturday in October each year and is sponsored by the GFWC Georgia Bremen Junior Woman's Club.

Sports complex
All ball fields are available for rent by individuals, groups or organizations. Fields are also available to rent for private tournaments.  This complex provides parking space, playgrounds, batting cages, full concessions and restrooms. The Community Center is also located within the confines of this complex.

The Sports Complex contains the following fields:
 Four youth-size fields (one grass infield, one all-grass infield and two with skinned infields; all fields have lights with the exception of Field #6) - dimensions:  base paths and up to  pitching distances
 One middle school-size field, with an all-grass infield, with dirt section cut-outs around all bases and the pitching mound, and with lights - dimensions:  base paths and a  pitching distance
 One high school-size field, with an all-grass infield, with dirt section cut-outs around all bases and the pitching mound, and with lights - dimensions:  base paths and a  pitching distance

Bremen Fire Department
Bremen Fire Rescue is located at 191 Georgia Avenue North in Bremen. It operates one 2000 GPM engine, one 1500 GPM reserve engine, one 109’ ladder truck, and one staff car. BFR operates with 5 firefighters per shift on a 24-hour rotation, 365 days a year. Bremen Fire Rescue currently employs 16 full-time career firefighters and two part-time personnel. The department receives mutual aid from Haralson County Fire Department and Carroll County Fire Rescue. Bremen is located within both counties. Bremen also receives mutual aid from the City of Carrollton Fire Department Ladder 21. BFR is a member of the West Georgia Haz-Mat Team, which is stationed at Carrollton Fire Department, station number 21.

BFR provides many non-emergency services to the public, including fire extinguisher training, public education classes, station tours, blood pressure checks, fire inspections, and smoke detector checks and installation. Bremen Fire Rescue also operates a volunteer unit (C.E.R.T. TEAM) titled B.E.R.T. (Bremen Emergency Response Team).

Bremen Fire Rescue responds to a wide array of calls, including all fire calls, emergency medical calls, vehicle accidents, entrapments, hazardous materials incidents, gas leaks, natural disasters, alarms at residential, commercial, and industrial buildings, and carbon monoxide alarms.

Transportation
U.S. 78 runs east=west through Bremen. U.S. 27 runs north-south to the west of the city. Business route 27 runs through the center of Bremen. Interstate 20 runs to the south of Bremen.

West Georgia Regional Airport is seven miles south of Bremen.

Historically, the Southern Railway ran several daily passenger trains, including the Kansas City-Florida Special, the Sunnyland and an Atlanta-Birmingham section of the Piedmont Limited, making stops in Bremen. The last trains made stops in 1967. The former the Southern Railway train (Now Amtrak) Crescent, which operates from New York City to New Orleans passes through Bremen twice a day on the Norfolk Southern, but makes no stops.

Notable people

 Sammy Byrd (1906–1981), major league baseball player and professional golfer
 Neal Horsley (1944–2015), anti-abortion activist
 Hugh McGraw (1931–2017), Sacred Harp singing master and composer
 Thomas Bailey Murphy (1924–2007), speaker of the Georgia House of Representatives
 Harold Shedd (born 1931), country music industry executive and producer
 J.J Mangham Sr.(1877–1971), Georgia Gubernatorial Candidate
 Jake Verity, placekicker for the Indianapolis Colts

References

External links
 City of Bremen official website
 Bremen Parks & Recreation Department

 
Cities in Georgia (U.S. state)
Cities in Haralson County, Georgia
Cities in Carroll County, Georgia